Rhinoneura caerulea is a species of jewel damselfly in the family Chlorocyphidae.

The IUCN conservation status of Rhinoneura caerulea is "DD", data deficient, risk undetermined.

References

Further reading

 

Chlorocyphidae
Articles created by Qbugbot
Insects described in 1936